Joan of France (23 April 1464 – 4 February 1505), was briefly Queen of France as wife of King Louis XII, in between the death of her brother, King Charles VIII, and the annulment of her marriage. After that, she retired to her domain, where she soon founded the monastic Order of the Annunciation of the Blessed Virgin Mary, where she served as abbess. From this Order later sprang the religious congregation of the Apostolic Sisters of the Annunciation, founded in 1787 to teach the children of the poor. She was canonized on 28 May 1950.

Family
Joan was born on 23 April 1464 in the castle of Pierre II de Brézé, a trusted supporter of her grandfather, King Charles VII of France, at Nogent-le-Roi in the County of Dreux. She was the second daughter of King Louis XI of France and of his second wife Charlotte of Savoy; her surviving siblings were King Charles VIII of France and Anne of France. Shortly after her birth, the king signed an agreement to marry her to his second cousin Louis, the Duke of Orléans, later King Louis XII of France, who was aged two at the time. Joan was born sickly and deformed. In Women Saints – Lives of Faith and Courage, Kathleen Jones says that Joan had a hump on her back and walked with a limp, suggesting that she had an abnormal curvature of the spine.

Often away on royal duties, King Louis entrusted his daughters, Joan and Anne, to the Baron François de Linières and his wife, Anne de Culan. The couple, who were childless, lavished affection on Joan. Taking charge of her education, they had her taught both poetry and mathematics, painting, embroidery and how to play the lute.

The couple were also faithful Catholics and instilled in the members of their household a solid grounding in the faith. At a young age, her father asked her to name the confessor she wanted. She gave him the only name she knew, that of Friar Jean de La Fontaine, Guardian of the Franciscan friary in Amboise. The king approved her choice and appointed the friar to this post. Despite the distance between them, he would travel regularly to hear the princess's confession. Joan began to develop a strong pleasure in prayer, and would pass long periods in the castle chapel. The baron supported her in this and had a path paved between the castle and the chapel built for easier walking in poor weather. Under the friar's guidance she was admitted into the Third Order of St. Francis.

In 1471 King Louis XI ordered the catechism of reciting the Hail Mary for peace to be practised throughout the kingdom. Joan had a strong attachment to this particular prayer. She would later write that it was in that same year that she had received a prophecy from the Virgin Mary that some day she would found a religious community in honor of Our Lady.

Marriage

In 1473 King Louis had signed marriage contracts for his daughters. On 8 September 1476, at the age of 12, Joan was married to the young Louis, Duke of Orléans in Montrichard. The marriage was arranged because Joan, due to her malformation, was supposed to be sterile. By doing so, Louis XI hoped to extinguish the Orléans cadet branch of the House of Valois. Louis was displeased at the forced marriage, and his treatment of his new wife reflected this.

King Louis died in 1483 and was succeeded by his son Charles, but as he was still a child, his sister, Anne de Beaujeu, was made Regent of the kingdom. By 1484, the duke had begun a series of military campaigns against the kingdom. This lasted until 1488, when he was taken captive by the royal forces. During this period, he fathered an illegitimate son, Michel de Bussy, who was later appointed the Bishop of Bourges. Joan administered his domain during his imprisonment, especially the Italian cities of Milan and Asti. Joan, imagining virtues in her husband that did not exist, exerted herself to mitigate his sufferings and to get him freed. Duke Louis was released in 1491. Within a few years, he accompanied King Charles on his military campaign in Italy.

When Louis ascended to the throne in April 1498 after the accidental death of Joan's brother, King Charles VIII, he appealed to the pope to have the marriage annulled in order to marry the late king's widow, Anne of Brittany, in the hope of annexing the Duchy of Brittany to the French Crown.

In what has been described as "one of the seamiest lawsuits of the age", Louis did not, as might be expected, argue the marriage to be void due to consanguinity (the general excuse for the dissolution of a marriage at that time). Louis argued that he had been below the legal age of consent (fourteen) to marry and that the marriage had never been consummated due to her physical deformity, and provided a rich variety of detail as to how she was malformed. Joan, unsurprisingly, fought this uncertain charge fiercely, producing witnesses to Louis boasting of having "mounted my wife three or four times during the night." Louis also claimed that his sexual performance had been inhibited by witchcraft; Joan responded by asking how, in that case, he was able to know what it was like to try to make love to her.  Joan would likely have won, for Louis's case was exceedingly weak, however Pope Alexander VI was committed for political reasons to grant the annulment.

The commission of investigation appointed by the pope established that the marriage with Joan was invalid for lack of consent and that it never had been consummated. Accordingly, he ruled against the Queen. The annulment was declared on 15 December 1498. Joan stepped aside, saying that she would pray for her former husband. She was made Duchess of Berry and retired to Bourges, capital of the duchy.

Religious life and sainthood

Once settled in her new domain, Joan confided to her spiritual director, the Blessed Gabriel Mary, O.F.M.,  her call to monastic life. He supported her in this venture, and she began to make plans for the Order of the Annunciation of the Blessed Virgin Mary, a new enclosed religious order in honour of the Annunciation (the announcement to Virgin Mary by an angel that she would become the mother of Jesus, although she was a virgin). It was established as an independent branch of the Poor Clares. By May 1500 she had received 11 postulants, the nucleus of the new Order. The Rule of Life she had written for the Order was approved on 12 February 1502 by Pope Alexander. Construction of the first monastery was begun the following year. On Pentecost Sunday 1504, Joan and Friar Gabriel Mary made private commitments to follow the Rule, and thereby established themselves as co-founders of the Order. On 21 November of that same year, the Feast of the Presentation of Mary, Joan and the other women publicly and legally committed themselves to the Order.

Joan died on 4 February 1505 and was buried in the chapel of the Annonciade monastery. Her grave, however, was desecrated during the French Wars of Religion and her body, which was found to be incorrupt, was burned by the Huguenots during their sack of Bourges on 27 May 1562. Soon after her death, miracles and healings attributed to her were said to have occurred. The cause for her canonization was begun in 1631 and Pope Benedict XIV beatified her on 21 April 1742. She was canonized on 28 May 1950 by Pope Pius XII.

Legacy
The religious sisters of the Order of the Annunciation of the Blessed Virgin Mary still maintain their way of life in monasteries in France, Belgium, Costa Rica and Poland. The sisters serve in Belgium, Burundi, Cameroon, the Democratic Republic of the Congo, France and Guatemala.

Ancestry

Notelist

References

Bibliography
Hale, J. R., Renaissance Europe: Individual and Society, 1480–1520, New York: Harper & Row, 1972.
Retrieved  27 June 2008

|-

|-

|-

1464 births
1505 deaths
People from Eure-et-Loir
French princesses
French queens consort
Dauphines of Viennois
Joan
Members of the Third Order of Saint Francis
Dukes of Berry
French people of Cypriot descent
Repudiated queens
Joan
Berry, Duchess of, Joan of France
Poor Clares
Founders of Catholic religious communities
Burials in Centre-Val de Loire
Joan of France
15th-century French women
15th-century French people
16th-century French nuns
Joan of France
Joan of France
Joan of France
Joan of France
Joan of France
Beatifications by Pope Benedict XIV
Daughters of kings